Archaeodontosaurus ("ancient-toothed lizard") is a genus of sauropod dinosaur from the Middle Jurassic. Its fossils were found in the Isalo III Formation of Madagascar. The type species, Archaeodontosaurus descouensi, was described in September 2005. The specific name honours the collector, Didier Descouens. It is a probable sauropod, with prosauropod-like teeth. It may be a basal member of Gravisauria.

References

External links 
 dml.cmnh.org
 

Sauropods
Dinosaurs of India and Madagascar
Middle Jurassic dinosaurs of Africa
Bajocian life
Bathonian life
Fossil taxa described in 2005
Taxa named by Éric Buffetaut
Fossils of Madagascar